The traditional Chinese calendar divides a year into 24 solar terms. Chūnfēn, Shunbun, Chunbun, or Xuân phân is the 4th solar term. It begins when the Sun reaches the celestial longitude of 0° and ends when it reaches the longitude of 15°. In the Gregorian calendar, it usually begins around 20 March and ends around 4 April (5 April East Asia time). It more often refers in particular to the day when the Sun is exactly at the celestial longitude of 0°.

Pentads 

Each solar term can be divided into 3 pentads (候). They are: first pentad (初候), second pentad (次候) and last pentad (末候). Pentads in Chunfen include:

 China
 First pentad: 玄鳥至, 'The dark birds arrive'. 'Dark bird' in this case refers to swallows, which are also making their northward migration.
 Second pentad: 雷乃發聲, 'Thunder sounds', referring to the onset of spring thunderstorms.
 Last pentad: 始電, 'Lightning begins'. This refers to thunderstorms as well, but also to the gradual lengthening of daytime, and the prevalence of sunlight.

 Japan
A pentad as follows was referred to Japanese traditional calendar presented in a smaller, easy to use, format.
 First pentad: , 'Sparrow begins holding a nest'.
 Second pentad: , 'Cherry blossoms open for the first time'.
 Last pentad: , 'Distant thunder start to sound'.

Date and time

See also
 Equinox

References 

04
Spring (season)
Observances on non-Gregorian calendars 
March observances
April observances